The Syracuse Eagles were a professional ice hockey team based in Syracuse, New York. The team relocated from Jacksonville, Florida that summer who were known as the Jacksonville Barons and previously the Cleveland Barons who were one of the most historic and illustrious teams of the American Hockey League from the 1930s to the 1960s. The team played home games in the Onondaga County War Memorial Coliseum. The Eagles were a member of the American Hockey League for one season during 1974–1975, finishing fourth with a record of 21 wins, 43 losses and 11 ties. Coaching duties were split by Art Stratton, Billy Orr (on an interim basis) and John Hanna. The team leading scorer was Dick Sarrazin (33 goals and 37 assists in 75 games), with Jacques Caron registering a 3.70 goals against average during 50 games in goal.

The city of Syracuse struggled to support two minor league teams during the 1974–1975 season. After the Syracuse Blazers won the 1973 Eastern Hockey League title, that league folded. The Syracuse Blazers moved to the newly formed North American Hockey League, and were league champions in 1973–1974 and 1976–1977. A splinter group from the Blazers ownership were awarded an AHL franchise, dividing the city's fan base. Between the two teams they played 75 home games during the 1974–1975 regular season. The Eagles failed to garner sufficient spectator support to last a second season despite playing in a higher level league.

Results

 Syracuse Eagles roster and statistics

References 

Defunct American Hockey League teams
Ice hockey clubs established in 1974
Ice hockey clubs disestablished in 1975
Ice hockey teams in New York (state)
Eagles
Defunct sports teams in New York (state)
1974 establishments in New York (state)
1975 disestablishments in New York (state)